Catascopellus crassiceps is a species of beetle in the family Carabidae, the only species in the genus Catascopellus.

References

Lebiinae